Georgette Herbos (born 1884, date of death unknown) was a Belgian competitive figure skater and Olympic athlete. Alongside Georges Wagemans she competed as a pair figure skater in the 1920 Summer Olympics and the 1924 Winter Olympics.

Results

References

External link

1884 births
Place of birth missing
Date of death missing
Place of death missing
Belgian female pair skaters
Olympic figure skaters of Belgium
Figure skaters at the 1920 Summer Olympics
Figure skaters at the 1924 Winter Olympics